Chacomylus is an extinct genus of odd-toed ungulate condylarth which existed in the Nacimiento Formation, United States during the early Paleocene period (Puercan age). It was first named by Thomas E. Williamson and Anne Weil in 2011 and the type species is Chacomylus sladei.

References

Condylarths
Fossil taxa described in 2011
Paleocene mammals of North America
Fossils of the United States
Prehistoric placental genera